Zing finger protein 644 (ZNF644) also known as zinc finger motif enhancer-binding protein 2 (Zep-2) is a protein that in humans is encoded by the ZNF644 gene.

Clinical relevance
Mutations in the ZNF644 gene have been found in sporadic cases of high myopia.

References

Further reading

 

Transcription factors